The 2000 Preston by-election was a parliamentary by-election held in England on 23 November 2000, to elect a new Member of Parliament (MP) for the House of Commons constituency of Preston in Lancashire.

The vacancy was caused by the death on 2 September 2000 of Audrey Wise, the constituency's Labour Party MP.

The Labour vote share declined, but with the main beneficiaries being fringe parties, the Labour candidate Mark Hendrick held the seat comfortably.

Peter Garrett used the description "Preston Christian Alliance". David Braid used the description "Battle for Britain"

Results

General election result, 1997

See also
Preston (UK Parliament constituency)
Preston
1915 Preston by-election
1929 Preston by-election
1936 Preston by-election
1940 Preston by-election
1946 Preston by-election
Lists of United Kingdom by-elections

References

By-elections to the Parliament of the United Kingdom in Lancashire constituencies
2000 elections in the United Kingdom
2000 in England
Elections in Preston
2000s in Lancashire
November 2000 events in the United Kingdom